Sostratus (Σώστρατος Sostratos) may refer to:

Sostratos of Aegina, Greek merchant
Sostratos of Chios, ancient Greek sculptor
Sostratus of Cnidus, designer of the Lighthouse of Alexandria
Sostratus of Dyme, Greek mythological hero and friend of Hercules
Sostratus of Macedon, conspirator against Alexander
Sostratus of Pellene,  runner and Olympic winner
Sostratus of Sicyon, Olympic pankratiast